Richardson River may refer to:
Richardson River (Canada)
Richardson River (Victoria) in Australia